A1 Team USA was the American team of A1 Grand Prix, an international racing series.

Management 
Owner Rick Weidinger became interested in A1 Team USA and the A1 Grand Prix series when national franchises were being bid for the new series. Along with minority partners and friends Rusty Lewis and Bill Dean, Weidinger finalized the franchise acquisition in July 2005. The engineering side of the team was originally run by British squads David Price Racing, and then West Surrey Racing. For 2008–2009 the team was run by IndyCar Series team Andretti Green Racing and Andretti Green's IndyCar drivers, primarily Marco Andretti drove the majority of races.

History

2008–09 season 

Driver: Marco Andretti, Charlie Kimball, J. R. Hildebrand

2008-09 marked the first season in which Andretti Green Racing ran Team USA. Following the Zandvoort race, it was announced that Marco Andretti and Danica Patrick would race for Team USA at some point during the season.

2007–08 season 

Drivers: Buddy Rice, Jonathan Summerton

After a slow start to the season, Team USA gradually improved, peaking with the team's first victory. Along with 2 podiums, the team finished 12th in the championship.

2006–07 season 

Drivers: Phil Giebler, Ryan Hunter-Reay

Team USA scored two podiums, and other consistent scoring to finish in 9th place in the championship.

2005–06 season 

Drivers: Bryan Herta, Phil Giebler, Scott Speed

In the inaugural season, Team USA finished in 16th place in the championship.

2006 Indianapolis 500 entry 

Wanting to continue the momentum of A1 Team USA and pursue the idea of celebrating American open-wheel racing, team owner Rick Weidinger decided to take the We The People livery to the 90th running of the Indianapolis 500. American racing icon Al Unser Jr. returned from retirement to join the effort. Al, along with his father and uncle, hold 9 Indianapolis 500 victories to their credit; 2 of those belonging to Al Jr. in 1992 and 1994. The 2006 Indy 500 was Al's 18th Indy start.

With operational structure provided by Dreyer & Reinbold Racing, A1 Team USA brought U.S. insurance giant GEICO to complete the American effort as the primary sponsorship partner. With everything in place, Al Unser Jr. took the We The People car out for its maiden laps around the historic Indianapolis Motor Speedway on May 7, 2006. At the 2006 Indianapolis 500, "Little Al" qualified 27th of 33 cars, and was able to move up the field and race in the top half of the pack for most of the race. However, a crash ended his day, finishing 24th with 145 laps completed.

Drivers

Complete A1 Grand Prix results 

(key), "spr" indicate a Sprint Race, "fea" indicate a Main Race.

References

External links

Official Team Web Site - A1 Team USA
A1gp.com Official A1 Grand Prix Web Site

American auto racing teams
Men's national sports teams of the United States
USA A1 team
Auto racing teams established in 2005
Auto racing teams disestablished in 2009